
Arad is a town in Bahrain, located on Muharraq Island. It was originally a small farming village inhabited by Baharna Shia, but later expanded to include new middle-class housing, which brought with it a large Sunni population.

Geography
Arad lies east of Muharraq City and northwest of the town of Hidd. It was originally a separate island (called Arad Island) but was joined to Muharraq over the course of the 20th century through land reclamation.

Arad Bay 
The town is home to Arad Bay, a protected mangrove area and recreational park. Opened in 2010, the 10 million BHD park covers 3.3km of walkways and includes four bridges. The bay is home to wildlife including plankton, fish, seaweed, in addition to seasonal migratory birds such as greater flamingoes.

History
The name Arad comes from the Greek word Arados, the Greek name for Muharraq island alongside Tylos for the main Bahrain island. It was believed that Arados was originally a Phoenician settlement, as described by the Greek historian Strabo.

The Arad Fort, the Al Muharraq Stadium, and the headquarters of the Islamic Society (Bahrain) are located in the town.

Governance
The town is administered under the Muharraq Governorate.

Education
The Bahraini Ministry of Education operates government schools nationwide. Within the Arad area, they operate boys schools include Al Kawarzmi Primary Boys School, Al-Dair Primary Boys School, Arad Primary Boys School, and Arad Primary Intermediate Boys School. Girls schools include Al Oroba Primary Girls School, Arad Intermediate Girls School, and Arad Primary Girls School.

References

Populated places in the Muharraq Governorate